The former Corinth railway station (Sidirodromikos Stathmos Korinthou) was on the former metre gauge Piraeus, Athens and Peloponnese Railways (Piraeus–Patras railway).

The Piraeus, Athens and Peloponnese Railways reached Corinth in July 1884. Some parts of the station date from 1916 and 1929, and the main building, designed by architect Anthony Dragoymi, was built in 1955. The station closed to regular traffic on 9 July 2007, having been replaced by a new station on the new line. It continued to be used by tourist excursion trains, but newer road development and -resurfacing efforts, as well as private building access roads, have permanently covered the rails in both directions.

Gallery

References

External links

Corinth railway station Photo on Panoramio.

Railway stations in Corinthia
Railway stations opened in 1884
Railway stations closed in 2007
Piraeus, Athens and Peloponnese Railways
Buildings and structures in Corinthia